Lalo is an islet of the Fakaofo island group of Tokelau.

References
Map of Fakaofo Atoll
Map of Fakaofo Island

Islands of Tokelau
Pacific islands claimed under the Guano Islands Act
Fakaofo